DWBS (1008 AM), broadcasting as Veritas 1008, is a radio station owned and operated by Diocesan Multimedia Services, Inc., the media arm of the Diocese of Legazpi. Its studio and transmitter is located at the 2nd Floor, DMSI HUB (Old St. Jude Catholic School Compound), Sol's Subdivision Brgy. Bitano, Legazpi, Albay.

References

Radio stations in Legazpi, Albay
News and talk radio stations in the Philippines
Radio stations established in 1990